The 1936 AAA Championship Car season consisted of four races, beginning in Speedway, Indiana on May 30 and concluding in Westbury, New York on October 12.  There were also three non-championship events.  The AAA National Champion was Mauri Rose, and the Indianapolis 500 winner was Louis Meyer.

Schedule and results

Leading National Championship standings

References

See also
 1936 Indianapolis 500

AAA Championship Car season
AAA Championship Car
1936 in American motorsport